Clarence Hector Riordan (1 August 1917 – 29 September 1995) was an Australian rules footballer who played with St Kilda in the Victorian Football League (VFL).

Notes

External links 

1917 births
1995 deaths
Australian rules footballers from Victoria (Australia)
St Kilda Football Club players
Kyneton Football Club players